Forteza is a surname. Notable people with the surname include:

Barbie Forteza (born 1997), Filipina actress
Francisco Forteza (1892-1967), Uruguayan political figure
Francisco Forteza (son) (1928-2005), Uruguayan political figure
Lorena Forteza (born 1976), Colombian actress
Pascual Martinez-Forteza (born 1972), Spanish clarinetist
Paula Forteza (born 1986), French politician